Wen Gang (born August 1966) is a Chinese executive and politician, currently serving as chairman of China Rongtong Asset Management Group Corporation Limited.

He was a representative of the 19th National Congress of the Chinese Communist Party. He is a representative of the 20th National Congress of the Chinese Communist Party and an alternate member of the 20th Central Committee of the Chinese Communist Party.

Biography 
Wen was born in Taiyuan, Shanxi, in August 1966, and graduated from Beijing University of Technology. 

He worked in China Northern Chemical Industry Corporation before being assigned to the China North Industries Corporation. In 2003, he became deputy general manager, rising to general manager in 2013. In August 2018, he was promoted again to become chairman, but having held the position for only five months. 

In 2020, he was appointed chairman of the newly founded China Rongtong Asset Management Group Corporation Limited.

References 

1966 births
Living people
People from Taiyuan
Beijing University of Technology alumni
People's Republic of China politicians from Shanxi
Chinese Communist Party politicians from Shanxi
Alternate members of the 20th Central Committee of the Chinese Communist Party